Omowunmi Akinnifesi (born December 4, 1987)  is a Nigerian businesswoman and environmental ambassador for Lagos.

Early life and education
The daughter of a former Central Bank of Nigeria director, Akinnifesi was born on the 4th of December, 1986 in Lagos but spent her early years in Sierra Leone before returning to her native Nigeria with her family. She attended Queen's College, Yaba, where she won several prizes for her art work. In 2008, Akinnifesi graduated from the University of Lagos with a degree in Geography and Regional Planning, In 2012, Akinnifesi obtained a master's degree in Environmental Monitoring, Modelling, and Management from King's College London.

Career
In 2005, eighteen-year-old Akinnifesi was crowned Most Beautiful Girl in Nigeria, making her eligible to represent her country at the Miss World Pageant in China that same year, where she engaged in tree planting for the Chinese government. Akinnifesi emerged first runner-up on the Nigerian version of Strictly Come Dancing, Celebrity Takes 2 before she launched her own public relations and usher-hiring business Elle Poise. Aknnifesi has been hailed as a style icon in recent years, and was honoured at the 2011 Allure Style Awards. It was during this time that she revealed that she had experienced a six-year campaign of terror from a stalker.

In 2016, Akinnifesi launched her clothing line labelled,  "Omowunmi"

References

Most Beautiful Girl in Nigeria winners
1986 births
Living people
Queen's College, Lagos alumni
University of Lagos alumni
Alumni of King's College London
Miss World 2005 delegates
Businesspeople from Lagos
Nigerian fashion businesspeople
21st-century Nigerian businesswomen
21st-century Nigerian businesspeople
Beauty pageant contestants from Lagos
Yoruba people